Precious Stones is a 1918 German silent drama film directed by Rudolf Biebrach and starring Paul Bildt, Henny Porten and Paul Hartmann.

The film's sets were designed by the art director Ludwig Kainer.

Cast
 Paul Bildt as Der alte Dergan 
 Henny Porten as Magdalena Dergan 
 Paul Hartmann as Graf Forrest 
 Hanna Brohm as Gräfin Forrest 
 Theodor Loos as Pieter Swandam

References

Bibliography
 Bock, Hans-Michael & Bergfelder, Tim. The Concise CineGraph. Encyclopedia of German Cinema. Berghahn Books, 2009.
 Jung, Uli & Schatzberg, Walter. Beyond Caligari: The Films of Robert Wiene. Berghahn Books, 1999.

External links

1918 films
Films of the German Empire
German silent feature films
Films directed by Rudolf Biebrach
German drama films
1918 drama films
UFA GmbH films
German black-and-white films
Silent drama films
1910s German films
1910s German-language films